The Gres de Saint-Chinian is a geological formation in Aude and Hérault, France whose strata date back to the Late Cretaceous. Dinosaur remains are among the fossils that have been recovered from the formation.

Vertebrate paleofauna
Gres de Saint-Chinian outcrops in Département de L'Herault have produced dinosaur eggs, along with the indeterminate remains of avialans, enantiornithes, and possible indeterminate abelisaurids.

See also

 List of dinosaur-bearing rock formations

References

Upper Cretaceous Series of Europe